Events in the year 1836 in Norway.

Incumbents
Monarch: Charles III John

Events
The town of Tvedestrand was founded.
The first Lista Lighthouse was established.
Count Herman Wedel Jarlsberg is appointed Governor-general of Norway.

Arts and literature

Births
24 February – Elias Blix, poet, musician, politician and Minister (d.1902)
22 March – John Anderson, Norwegian-American newspaper publisher (d.1910)
22 September – Baard Iversen, businessperson and politician (d.1920)
14 November – Nikka Vonen, educator, folklorist and author (d. 1933).

Full date unknown
Ludvig Maribo Benjamin Aubert, jurist and politician (d.1896)
Hans Gløersen, forest manager and lawyer (d.1904)
Hans Syvert Jacobsen, politician

Deaths
8 May – Christen Thorn Aamodt, priest (b.1770)
12 September – Svend Borchmann Hersleb, professor of theology and politician (b.1784)

Full date unknown
Hans Jacob Stabel, priest and politician (b.1769)

References

See also